Ryan Benjamin Blakney (born May 24, 1985) is an American Major League Baseball (MLB) umpire.  He made his MLB debut on April 21, 2015.

For the 2018 regular season he was found to be one of the ten best home plate umpires in terms of accuracy in calling balls and strikes. His error rate was 7.97 percent. This was based on a study conducted at Boston University where 372,442 pitches were culled and analyzed. Blakney was promoted to a full-time umpiring position before the 2020 Major League Baseball season began.

Blakney was the home plate umpire during Reid Detmers's no-hitter on May 10, 2022.

In August 2022, USA Today ran an article on a missed call by him, saying “the missed call — and subsequent hilarious ejection — are a stark reminder that nobody is perfect.”

See also 

 List of Major League Baseball umpires

References

1985 births
Living people
People from Wenatchee, Washington
Major League Baseball umpires